Mittag-Lefflerbreen is a glacier at Spitsbergen, Svalbard. The glacier is located in Ny-Friesland, Dickson Land and Olav V Land, and debouches into Austfjorden. It is named after mathematician Gösta Mittag-Leffler. The lower, northern part of the glacier is included in the Indre Wijdefjorden National Park.

References

Glaciers of Spitsbergen